Alvacir dos Santos Raposo Filho (born January 18, 1950) is a brazilian physician and writer.

Born in Piaui, Brazil, Raposo moved as a young man to Recife, Pernambuco. He graduated from the Federal University of Pernambuco (UFPE) in 1974 with a doctorate in Ophthalmology.

Raposo is a professor at UFPE and the Faculty of Medical Sciences of the University of Pernambuco. He is a poet, composer frevos, having recorded a CD of gender to another physician and composer Luiz Guimaraes.

Professional training 
 Medical (UFPE);
 Master of Ophthalmology (UFPE), with a dissertation Retinal haemorrhages in newborns;
 Doctor of Medicine (Universidade Federal de São Paulo), with a thesis Variations of intraocular pressure in individuals undergoing testing stationary bike.

Books published 
 A resistência e a Natividade. Recife: Fundarpe, 1994
 A casa do vinho. Recife: Fundarpe, 1994
 O galo de metal. Recife: Bagaço, 1995
 Rua dos Arcos. Recife: Bagaço, 1996
 O discurso do rei. Recife: Fundação de Cultura Cidade do Recife, 1996
 Sonetos. Recife: Bagaço, 1999
 O território. Recife: Bagaço, 1999
 Os tambores. Recife: Bagaço, 1999
 O pássaro e a arca. Recife: Bagaço, 2001
 Ensaio das lâminas. Recife, 2003
 A chama intacta. Recife: Bagaço, 2008
 A rosa em chamas. Recife: Bagaço, 2012
 A flauta de vidro. Recife: Bagaço, 2014

Discography 
 Carnaval 2000 - CD frevo jointly with the medical composer Luiz Guimaraes.

Awards 
 Mauro Mota Prize for Poetry, FUNDARPE, 1992
 Mauro Mota Prize for Poetry, FUNDARPE, 1993
 Poetry Prize from the Academy of Arts Pernambuco, 1993
 Award Ladjane Flag, Diário de Pernambuco, 1994
 Award Eugenio Coimbra Junior, City Council Culture of Recife, 1995
 Poetry Prize from the Academy of Arts Pernambuco, 1996

Member of literary institutions 
 Academia Pernambucana de Letras - elected and installed in 2002
 Academia de Letras e Artes do Nordeste - having exercised its presidency
 Sociedade Brasileira de Médicos Escritores (SOBRAMES-PE) - Socio-holder
 Secretary for the biennium 1990-1991
 President in 1992-1993
 Academia Recifense de Letras
 Academia Piauiense de Letras (honorary member)

Bibliography
 Google-books - A poesia da Geração 65

References

Brazilian medical writers
Brazilian male poets
Brazilian ophthalmologists
Living people
1950 births
Federal University of Pernambuco alumni
People from Teresina
20th-century Brazilian male writers
20th-century Brazilian poets
21st-century Brazilian male writers
21st-century Brazilian poets